Sport Clube União Torreense is a Portuguese sports club, best known for its association football section, founded in Torres Vedras in 1917, as Sport União Torreense.

History
It participated six times in the Portuguese Liga (last in 1991–92 season) and its best result was two seventh final places (1955–56 and 1956–57), coincidentally the team's first two years in the top flight. Torreense participated in the 1956 final of the Cup of Portugal, where they lost 2–0 to FC Porto. 

They also played in Portuguese Second Division (second level) between 1952 and 1955, 1959 to 1964, 1965 to 1972, 1973 to 1977, 1978 to 1981, 1982 to 1991, 1992 to 1995, 1997 to 1998 and 2022.

In the 2008–09 season, they were relegated from Group D of Portuguese Second Division. In the 2009–10 season, they finished Promotion Group E of Terceira Divisão on second place and in 2010–11 they returned to the Portuguese Second Division, finishing it in third place.

Stadium

Its stadium was built in 1925 and has a capacity of 12,000 people.

Current squad

Honours

Taça de Portugal finalists: 1956
Segunda Divisão: 1954–55
Liga 3: 2021–22

References

Football clubs in Portugal
Association football clubs established in 1917
1917 establishments in Portugal
Primeira Liga clubs
Liga Portugal 2 clubs
Sport in Torres Vedras